4 Cassiopeiae is a red giant in the northern constellation of Cassiopeia, located approximately 790 light-years away from the Sun. It is visible to the naked eye as a faint, red-hued star with a baseline apparent visual magnitude of 4.96. At the distance of this system, its visual magnitude is diminished by an extinction of 0.56 due to interstellar dust. This system is moving closer to the Earth with a heliocentric radial velocity of −39 km/s.

An evolved red giant star, currently on the asymptotic giant branch, 4 Cassiopeiae has a stellar classification of M2− IIIab. It is a suspected variable star of unknown type with a brightness that varies from visual magnitude 4.95 down to 5.00.

Multiple star catalogues list a number of companions to 4 Cassiopeiae, all unrelated stars at different distances.  As of 2011, the magnitude 9.88 component B lay at an angular separation of  along a position angle of 226° relative to the primary.  Components C, E, F, and G are all fainter and more than two arc-minutes from 4 Cassiopeiae, and components C and G are themselves close doubles.

4 Cassiopeiae is 40' north of the open cluster Messier 52, near the constellation border with Cepheus, although it is not a member of the cluster.

References

M-type giants
Suspected variables
Binary stars
Cassiopeia (constellation)
BD+61 2444
Cassiopeiae, 04
220652
115590
8904